Eugenia lancetillae is a species of plant in the family Myrtaceae. It is endemic to Honduras.

References

lancetillae
Endemic flora of Honduras
Critically endangered flora of North America
Taxonomy articles created by Polbot